WMTJ (channel 40), branded on-air as Sistema TV, is a PBS member television station serving San Juan, Puerto Rico that is licensed to Fajardo. The station is owned by Ana G. Méndez University. WMTJ's studios are located in San Juan, and its transmitter is located in the El Yunque National Forest.

WMTJ has one full-service satellite: WQTO, virtual channel 26 (digital channel 19), in Ponce. WMTJ's digital signal was not on the air until a few months before the transition deadline. Digital transmitter deployment for WMTJ had been proven difficult as the transmitter site is located in a remote tropical forest on national park land, requiring USDA Forest Service approvals of any new transmission tower.

History
WMTJ first broadcast in April 1985.

Due to damage from Hurricane Maria, WMTJ was forced to go off the air on September 20, 2017 (the station's website still lists the schedule from September 11 to 17, 2017 with some shows no longer on the schedule such as Thomas and Friends). On October 16, 2017, the Ana G. Mendez University System announced that the station would be shut down indefinitely as part of a larger suspension of non-academic activities at the school. The shutdown left Puerto Rico without a PBS station since fellow public television station WIPR-TV (channel 6) had dropped its PBS membership in 2011. On December 20, WMTJ returned to the air via Liberty Puerto Rico, some of PBS programming can be seen on Channel 3 & 67 and in HD on channels 203 & 267. On January 2, 2018, just months after the shutdown, WMTJ resumed regular over-the-air broadcasting operations via WSTE-DT (Teleisla) and can be seen on channel 40.1 from the transmitter located in Aguas Buenas remaining on the air until January 23. On January 24, WMTJ resumed operations with a reduced power of 17.7 kilowatts from El Yunque. On January 1, 2019 WMTJ returned to the air on its digital channel 15 and transmitter power increased to 174 kilowatts. While the station is still available on Dish Network in Puerto Rico, the station is no longer available on DirecTV in Puerto Rico due to unknown reasons as of 2017. As of 2019, Sistema TV is one of the minority of the stations to not receive PBS' overhaul branding.

Local programming
The majority of the station's daily programming is from PBS, but it has some locally produced content as well.
TeleCampus
 Kinema
 Tertulia en la Ciudad
 Aventura Cientifica
 Geoambiente
 Charla Deportiva

Former local programming
 Análisis Noticioso
 Bienestar
 Como Coco
 Del Campo a la Mesa
 Jugando Pelota Dura (now on TeleOnce)
 Ruta U
 Sistema TV Informa
 Sistema TV Investiga
 Si a la Cocina
 Si a la Cultura
 Sin Colores
 Te Veo en Campus
 UNE Vision

Digital television

The station's digital signal is multiplexed:

On June 12, 2009, WMTJ and WQTO signed off its analog signal and completed its move to digital.

References

External links 
Ana G. Méndez University System
Sistema TV
PBS

PBS member stations
Fajardo, Puerto Rico
Ana G. Méndez University System
MTJ
Television channels and stations established in 1985
1985 establishments in Puerto Rico
Public broadcasting in Puerto Rico